The 2022–23 Derde Divisie season is the seventh edition of the Dutch fourth tier, formerly called Topklasse, since the restructuring of the league system in the summer of 2016.

Saturday league

Teams

Number of teams by province

Standings

Fixtures/results

Sunday league

Teams

Number of teams by province

Standings

Fixtures/results

References 

Derde Divisie seasons
Derde Divisie
Netherlands